is a specific name used for several taxa of bacterium:
 , a bacterium from seawater
 , a bacterium found in many habitats
 , a bacterium from planktonic seaweed
 , a bacterium from fermented brine

See also
 , a South American fossil mammal